Township 6 is one of five townships in Washington County, Nebraska, United States. The population was 1,516 at the 2000 census. A 2006 estimate placed the township's population at 1,713.

See also
County government in Nebraska

References

Townships in Washington County, Nebraska
Townships in Nebraska